Father Pascal Angelicus Melotto, OFM, popularly known as Father Mei Zhanchun was a Roman Catholic priest of the Franciscan Order,  Father Mei Memorial Catholic Hospital in Hankou, China was erected in his memory. He is one of the earliest Martyrs in China.

Early life and priesthood 
Father Mei was born in Lonigo, Italy in year 1864. He joined the Franciscan order in the year 1880.

Persecution and death in China 
Mei arrived in China in 1902 and adopted the Chinese name Father Mei Zhanchun.

He was kidnapped in 1923 and a large ransom was demanded. He was moved many times between Hubei and Henan provinces while in custody and died after three months because one of the kidnappers shot him in the stomach with a poisoned bullet. Shortly before dying, he said that, “I am happy to die for the Chinese. I lived in China for the Chinese and now I am happy to die for them.”

His remains were transferred to a memorial structure called the Mei Pavilion.

Erection of Memorial 
After the involvement of the Italian government and Vatican, a hospital by the name Father Mei Memorial Catholic hospital was erected as his memorial in Hankou.

Demolition of Memorial 
In 1952, all the missionaries were expelled from China and the hospital was renamed from Father Mei Memorial Catholic Hospital to Wuhan Jinyintan Hospital. In 2008, hospital was destroyed and moved to another location.

See also
List of kidnappings

References 

1864 births
1920s missing person cases
1923 deaths
Chinese murder victims
Christian martyrs
Formerly missing people
Franciscan missionaries
Italian people murdered abroad
Italian Roman Catholic missionaries
Kidnapped Chinese people
Kidnapped Italian people
Missing person cases in China
People murdered in China
Roman Catholic missionaries in China